"Before I Go" is a song by Japanese rock band Coldrain.  Written by frontman Masato Hayakawa and lead guitarist Ryo Yokochi, and produced by Michael Baskette, it was released as the third single from the band's seventh studio album Nonnegative, on 8 June 2022.

Background
On 6 June 2022 the band first teased "Before I Go" on their social media platforms as part of Sapporo Breweries' latest product Saporro Beer Gold Star promotional campaign, of which a teaser including the song for the advert was made available on YouTube as well as Japanese television. The band later released the song alongside it's accompanying music video two days later on 8 June. The band starred on the cover for Spotify's "Big in Japan" playlist which featured "Before I Go" to promote the newly released single on the platform.

Composition and lyrics
"Before I Go" has been described by critics as a post-hardcore, metalcore, hard rock, and an alternative rock song. The song runs at 170 BPM and is in the key of A major. It was written by frontman Masato Hayakawa and lead guitarist Ryo Yokochi and produced by Michael Baskette, and runs for four minutes and 6 seconds. Paul Brown of Wall of Sound noted that the song had an "uptempo drum beat that’ll have you bouncing around the room in no time", while George Knight of Thunderchord pointed out that the verses were almost "dance rock like in terms of grooviness."

Speaking to V13.net, Hayakawa explained the meaning of "Before I Go":

Track listing

Music video
The official music video for "Before I Go" was released on 8 June 2022 and was directed by Inni Vision.

The video features the band performing the song on the cliff-face of a quarry with a full set of studio lights. They perform the song during the day and transition to them performing during the nighttime towards the end of the song where they release a bunch of pyrotechnics into the sky surrounding the set to culminate the climax of the song as it ends. 

As of March 2023, the music video for "Before I Go" has over 800K views on YouTube.

Personnel 
Credits adapted from Tidal.

Coldrain

 Masato Hayakawa – lead vocals, lyrics, composition, arrangements
 Ryo Yokochi – lead guitar, programming, composition, arrangements
 Kazuya Sugiyama – rhythm guitar, arrangements
 Ryo Shimizu – bass guitar, arrangements
 Katsuma Minatani – drums, arrangements

Additional personnel
 Michael Baskette – producer, mixing, arrangements
 Brad Blackwood — mastering
 Jef Moll — recording engineer
 Joshua Saldate – assistant engineer

Charts

Weekly charts

Year-end charts

References

Coldrain songs
2022 songs
2022 singles
Warner Music Group singles
Songs written by Masato Hayakawa
Song recordings produced by Michael Baskette
Post-hardcore songs
Metalcore songs
Hard rock songs
Alternative rock songs